Brundavanapuram is a village and Gram panchayat of Nadigudem mandal, Suryapet district, in Telangana state.

References

Villages in Suryapet district